Viktor Friedrichovich Zvagelsky (born on 30 July 1963 in Moscow) is a Russian politician. He received his higher education at the Civil Engineering Institute named after V. V. Kuibyshev. After graduating from the institute he made his way up from engineer to deputy head at Glavmosvodokanal.

Businessman 

Since 1992, he has been actively engaged in the spirit drinks business and food industry.
In 2005–2007, he was deputy CEO of Federal Unitary Enterprise Rosspirtprom, headquartered in Moscow.
In 2007, he was elected to the State Duma of the fifth convocation from the regional group No.80, Moscow.
In 2011, he was elected to the State Duma of the sixth convocation.

He is the co-founder and head of Yat, Podmoskovnye Vechera trade house, and Krasnaya Zvezda group of companies engaged in the production and marketing of vodka.
 
In 1991, Zvagelsky was mentioned in the Ministry of the Interior reports as the founder of Larisa CJSC. His partner in the business and the other founder of Larisa was Arsen Kuchuberiya, an Abkhaz gang member with lengthy criminal record and a relative of kingpin Tengiz Kuchuberiya nicknamed Tengiz of Sukhumi who was killed in 2001. Another close business partner of Zvagelsky, Ruslan Torshkhoev, tried to keep in the dark. He is a financier and a member of an Ingush gang, chairman of the board of trustees in Bank Malogo Biznesa that served as a money laundering tool for Caucasian criminal groups.

In 1992–1997, Zvagelsky established a dozen companies engaged in similar business, including Amalgama, Iks-Ring, Vtoroi Vitok, Magistral, Larisa plus, and Soyuzproduct. Among his partners in the entities were a number of entrepreneurs and gangmen, however, only few proved to be long-term ones.  In 1998 Zvagelsky, Leonid Vigdorovich, Tatiana Iremashvili, and Aleksandr Mayorov bought Krasnaya Zvezda vodka distillery in Moscow region. Later the plant was renamed to Artel Yat.
According to the police, Zvagelsky had another business partner, Ruslan Torshkhoev, who tried to keep in the dark. He is a financier and an active member of an Ingush gang. He chaired the board of trustees in Bank Malogo Biznesa that served as a money laundering tool for Caucasian criminal groups. Torshkhoev and Dmitry Diyachkov were co-founders of the independent producer centre Project Media.
 
It was in 1998 that the story resulting in the initiation of criminal proceedings began. According to the police, Ruslan Torshkhoev and Viktor Zvagelsky acquired Agrotekhprombank that had financial difficulties. The two businessmen chose Dmirty Diyachkov to chair the board of trustees. Torshkhoev and Zvagelsky controlled the bank, but did not own it officially.

The two entrepreneurs began offering to hundreds of entities, mainly in spirit drinks business, to use the bank’s services for tax dodging. As a result, alcohol distilleries from all over the country opened accounts in Agrotekhprombank that used to be on the verge of bankruptcy. Among the entities using the bank’s services there were Krasnaya Zvezda, Liksar Saratov distillery, AFB-2 and Liviz St Petersburg distilleries owned by the local kingpin Aleksandr Sabadash,  Gatchina distillery, and many other alcohol manufacturers.  By the way, it was connections established through Gatchina distillery controlled by Sergei Naryshkin’s family that helped Zvagelsky strengthen his position in the State Duma.

In 2003, Zvagelsky in absentia faced charges of having organized a criminal association (art. 210 of the Criminal Code) and fraud (art. 159 of the Criminal Code) including tax avoidance amounting to 390 million rubles that his entities were to pay out to the Pension fund and other federal funds.  The charges were brought in absentia because the future Duma deputy chose to hide from law enforcers and was thus put on the wanted list. Termination of the case cost Zvagelsky much efforts and money.

In 2006, one of the dozens of Zvagelsky’s subsidiaries, Artelskie Vodki LLC, as main component of the manufacturing process used liqueurs that it bought in Kabardino Balkariya. Although excise tax on liqueurs was 6.3 times lower than that on ethanol, the company managed not to pay it anyway claiming that it had been paid by the liqueur manufacturer.  Tax authorities that required the company to pay out the amount due faced vigorous resistance in court.  Furthermore, the Federal tax service had taken away the license for alcohol manufacturing, yet the company was producing spirit drinks and did have a license.

In 2006, Yat was fined 600 thousand rubles for not informing the Federal Antimonopoly Service of having bought six entities, which was a violation of the law on competition and limiting of monopolistic activities in commodities market.

In 2008, the vodka Kazenka bottled in the Crystal plant in the capital entered the Moscow market.  When the new brand, not yet in production, was advertised, Moscow streets were flooded with posters saying "Kazenka. Coming soon. The movie." Film market participants stated that they knew nothing of the movie with such a title. Nevertheless, the Ministry of Culture web-site publicized information about the film claiming that the producers were granted a distribution certificate.

At that time, the Antimonopoly Service failed to prosecute the entity for violating the law on advertisement.  In 2009, when Kazenka entered the market, the agency had no authority to interfere.  The other day the service fined companies placing billboards, the fine amounting to the ridiculous 100 thousand rubles. The customers of the advertisement order remain unknown.  Mass media, in contrast to the Antimonopoly Service, knew perfectly well that Kazenka brand belonged to Vodochnaya Artel Yat Management Company, a co-founder in which is deputy Viktor Zvagelsky, who claims to actively fight alcoholism in Russia.

Deputy of the State Duma of the fifth convocation 

In the State Duma of the fifth convocation, Zvagelsky was an ordinary member of the committee on economic policy, innovative development, and entrepreneurship.  In the next convocation he took a more prominent position of deputy chairman of the committee. Thus, a key position for the spirit drinks market is now filled with a
man who has criminal record and who during his previous tenure in the Duma imposed tolls and tributes for all relevant spirit drinks market participants. The tolls are now paid to Ingush gangs, the speaker of the State Duma Sergei Naryshkin, other lobbying deputies, and head of Federal service on control over alcohol manufacturing Igor Chuyan.

References and notes

1963 births
United Russia politicians
21st-century Russian politicians
Living people
Fifth convocation members of the State Duma (Russian Federation)
Sixth convocation members of the State Duma (Russian Federation)